Eliecer Navarro (born 26 October 1987 in David, Chiriquí, Panama) is a minor league baseball pitcher in the Pittsburgh Pirates organization. He pitched for Panama in the 2009 World Baseball Classic.

Minor league career
Navarro began his professional career with the Dominican Summer Pirates, in the Pittsburgh Pirates organization, in 2007. With them, he went 8–2 with a 2.83 ERA in 14 games (13 starts), striking out 85 batters in 70 innings of work. In 2008, he went 4–3 with a 1.42 ERA in 15 starts, striking out 108 batters in 76 innings. He went 4–2 with a 3.77 ERA in 10 games (three starts) for the GCL Pirates in 2009 and in 2010, he went 2–2 with a 3.12 ERA in 19 games (six starts) for the State College Spikes and West Virginia Power. The Pirates released Navarro in March 2014.

World Baseball Classic
In the 2009 World Baseball Classic, Navarro appeared in one game, pitching 1 innings of work. He allowed two hits, two runs (one of which was unearned), posting a 6.75 ERA.

References

External links

Living people
1987 births
Baseball players at the 2011 Pan American Games
Pan American Games competitors for Panama
2009 World Baseball Classic players
Gulf Coast Pirates players
State College Spikes players
West Virginia Power players
Bradenton Marauders players
People from Chiriquí Province
Altoona Curve players
Panamanian expatriate baseball players in the Dominican Republic
Indios de Mayagüez players
Panamanian expatriate baseball players in the United States
Gigantes de Carolina players
Dominican Summer League Pirates players
Panamanian expatriate baseball players in Puerto Rico